The 2010 Telstra Australian Swimming Championships were held from 16 March to 21 March 2010 in Sydney, New South Wales, Australia. They doubled as the national trials for the 2010 Commonwealth Games and 2010 Pan Pacific Swimming Championships.

Medal winners

Men

Women

References
 2010 Telstra champs 

S
Australian Swimming Championships, 2010
Australian Swimming Championships
Sports competitions in Sydney
2010s in Sydney
March 2010 sports events in Australia